Zmaj od Noćaja is the seventh studio album from Serbian rock band Bajaga i Instruktori, released on 8 October 2001. The name of the album refers to the name of a street in Belgrade. The street itself was named after Stojan Čupić, also known as Zmaj od Noćaja (Dragon of Noćaj), a hero from the First Serbian Uprising.

Zmaj od Noćaja featured a bonus CD entitled I ja sam Zvezdaš (I'm a Red Star Fan, Too), which featured three versions of the song "Zvezda", dedicated to the football club Red Star Belgrade.

The album featured a cover of The Clash song "Should I Stay or Should I Go", entitled "Da li da odem ili ne".

Track listing
"Lepa Janja, ribareva kći" – 3:41
"Da li da odem ili ne" – 3:02
"Gospod brine" – 5:50
"Tehno blues" – 4:18
"Zmaj od Noćaja" - 5:43
"Najslađa devojka" – 3:34
"Model 1960 - Es.Ef.Er.Jot" – 4:03
"Ala" – 3:41
"Perla" – 3:45
"Extasy pazi!!!" – 3:10
"Plavo" – 3:27

I ja sam zvezdaš bonus CD
"Zvezda" - 4:13
"Zvezda (Stadionska verzija)" - 4:17
"Zvezda (Matrica)" - 4:11

Personnel
Momčilo Bajagić - vocals, guitar
Žika Milenković - vocals, guitar
Miroslav Cvetković - bass guitar, backing vocals
Saša Lokner - keyboards, arranged by
Ljubiša Opačić - guitar, backing vocals, programming, arranged by
Čeda Macura - drums, backing vocals

Additional personnel
Marijana Popović - vocals
Ivan Ilić - trombone
Jovan Ilić - harmonica
Magnifico - voice (on track "Extasy pazi!!!")
Shatzi - voice (on track "Extasy pazi!!!")
Saša Habić - producer, arranged by, guitar, keyboards
Zoran Vukčević - engineer

References 
Zmaj od Noćaja at Discogs
 EX YU ROCK enciklopedija 1960-2006,  Janjatović Petar;

External links 
Zmaj od Noćaja at Discogs

Bajaga i Instruktori albums
2001 albums
PGP-RTS albums